"After All These Years" is a power ballad by the band Journey, the first single from their 2008 album Revelation. It peaked at No. 9 on the Billboard Adult Contemporary chart on September 20, 2008, giving the band their first top-ten hit in twelve years. It stayed on the chart for over 23 weeks. This is the first single from Journey to feature lead vocalist Arnel Pineda.

References

Journey (band) songs
2008 songs
2008 singles
2000s ballads
Hard rock ballads
Songs written by Jonathan Cain
Songs written by Neal Schon
Song recordings produced by Kevin Shirley